Air Mata Iboe (Perfected spelling: Air Mata Ibu; Malay for A Mother's Tears) is a 1941 film from the Dutch East Indies (now Indonesia) directed and written by Njoo Cheong Seng. Starring Fifi Young, Rd Ismail, Ali Sarosa, and Ali Joego, it followed a mother who raises her children lovingly but is ultimately betrayed by her eldest sons when she falls upon hard times. The film, billed as a "musical extravaganza," featured a soundtrack by R. Koesbini, and an eponymous title song written by Njoo.

The last production completed by Fred Young's Majestic Film Company, Air Mata Iboe was released in December 1941, shortly before the Japanese occupation of the Dutch East Indies. Now possibly lost, a remake was produced under the same title in 1957.

Plot 
Soegiati (Fifi Young) is the mother of four children: sons Achmad (Rd Ismail), Idris (S Poniman) and Soemadi (Ali Sarosa), and a daughter named Soepinah (Soelami). She loves them all, but Soemadi receives the most of her attention because he receives little from his father, the merchant Soebagio (Ali Joego). As the children grow, they marry and move away, and eventually only Soemadi is left. Although he begins a relationship with a young woman named Noormala (Soerip), he does not marry her as his income is not enough to support them.

On the night of Eid al-Fitr, the family gathers for the holiday. Unbeknownst to the family, Soebagio is leading a double life as a robber, and that evening the police come to arrest him. To protect his father, Soemadi declares himself the culprit, and he is exiled. Feeling guilty for his sins, Soebagio falls ill and dies soon afterwards. Because of their debts, their home and belongings are repossessed, leaving Soegiati to fend for herself.

Though wealthy, Achmad and Idris refuse to take Soegiati in, fearing their respective wives Moedjenah (Titing) and Mariam (Ning-Nong). Soepinah and her husband Bakar (Koesbini) are willing to take her in, but they live in poverty. Unwilling to burden them, ultimately Soegiati decides to leave and find her own way, depending on the kindness of strangers. Years pass, and Soemadi returns from exile. Encountering his mother, who now lives in poverty, he decides to take revenge on his brothers.

Production 

The Malang-based Majestic Film Company announced Air Mata Iboe in June 1941 together with two other films, Boedi Terbenam (Hidden Wisdom) and Bachtera Karam (Wrecked Ark). Production began soon afterwards and, by early December 1941, over 55 reels had been shot, as well as 60 sound reels.

Air Mata Iboe was written and directed by Njoo Cheong Seng under his penname M. d'Amour; he had previously directed Djantoeng Hati (Heart and Soul; 1941), which also had a tragic ending. The film was produced by the company's owner, Fred Young. It starred Njoo's wife Fifi Young (no relation to Fred), Rd Ismail, Ali Sarosa, and Ali Joego. Other roles were held by established singers of keroncong (traditional music with Portuguese influences), including Soerip, Titing, Soelami, Ning Nong, and Poniman. The film, which used make-up to make Fifi Young age into an old woman over the course of its plot, was the actress' first for Majestic; she had been ill during the production of her husband's debut for the company.

The black-and-white film featured eleven keroncong songs written by music director R. Koesbini, who also had a role in the film. Backing music was provided by Koesbini's troupe, the Krontjong Syncopaters, while songs were performed by the cast. Notes and lyrics for the film's title song, "Air Mata Iboe", were published in the December 1941 edition of Pertjatoeran Doenia dan Film.

Release and legacy 

Air Mata Iboe, which was rated for all ages, was distributed by Columbia Pictures and premiered at Sampoerna Theatre in Surabaya on 24 December 1941. Also advertised under the Dutch title Tranen Eener Moeder (a literal translation from Malay), the film was promoted as a "musical extravaganza"; other advertisements emphasised the size of the cast. An anonymous review in De Indische Courant noted the extensive use of keroncong and praised the acting and singing, suggesting that native audiences would flock to see the film.

Air Mata Iboe was the last film produced by Majestic Film Company, which closed following the Japanese occupation. During the occupation Njoo, Fifi Young, and Fred Young established their own travelling theatrical troupe, Pantjawarna, though all returned to cinema in the 1950s. Joego likewise returned to film after spending the occupation in theater. Poniman, Sarosa, Ismail, and Soerip all returned to cinema, the men in the 1950s and Soerip in 1973. Soelami is not recorded as acting in any further productions.

A remake of Air Mata Iboe, titled Air Mata Ibu, was produced in 1957, after Indonesia obtained its independence. Directed by Fred Young, the film had Fifi Young retake her role as Soegiati, while Rd Ismail took the role of Soebagio. The remake's other cast members had not appeared in the original film. The sons Achmad, Idris, and Soemadi were portrayed by Sukarno M. Noor, Boes Boestami, and Kamsul, respectively. The couple's daughter, renamed Atikah, was played by Farida Arriany.

Air Mata Iboe may be lost. As elsewhere at the time, films in the Dutch East Indies were shot on highly unstable nitrate film, and after a fire destroyed much of Produksi Film Negara's warehouse in 1952, earlier films shot on nitrate were deliberately destroyed. Thus, the American visual anthropologist Karl G. Heider wrote that all Indonesian films made before 1950 are lost. However, JB Kristanto's Katalog Film Indonesia (Indonesian Film Catalogue) records several as having survived at Sinematek Indonesia's archives.

Explanatory notes

References

Works cited 

 
 
 
 
 
 
 
 
 
 
 
 
 
 
 
 
 
 
 

Films directed by Njoo Cheong Seng
Dutch East Indies films
Indonesian black-and-white films
Lost Indonesian films